Faltonius Pinianus (c. 235  aft. 286) was a Proconsul of Asia in 286 or 305.

He was the son of Faltonius Restitutianus.

He married and had issue:
Faltonius (born c. 260), married to Maecia Proba (born c. 270), daughter of Marcus Maecius Orfitus (born c. 245) and wife Furia (born c. 244), paternal granddaughter of Marcus Maecius Probus (born c. 220) and wife Pupiena Sextia Paulina Cethegilla (born c. 225), and great-granddaughter of Marcus Pomponius Maecius Probus, and had:
Faltonius Probus (born c. 295), married to Betitia (born c. 300), daughter of Betitius Perpetuus Arzygius, and had:
Faltonia Betitia Proba

Sources
Continuité gentilice et continuité sénatoriale dans les familles sénatoriales romaines à l'époque impériale, 2000

3rd-century Romans
230s births
Year of birth uncertain
Year of death unknown
Year of birth unknown